Patio de Agua is a district of the El Guarco canton, in the Cartago province of Costa Rica.

Geography 
Patio de Agua has an area of  km² and an elevation of  metres.

Locations 
 Poblados (villages): Bajo Zopilote, Caragral, Común

Demographics 

For the 2011 census, Patio de Agua had a population of  inhabitants.

References 

Districts of Cartago Province
Populated places in Cartago Province